The Risk Information Exchange (RiskIE) is an Internet database created in 2007 by Toxicology Excellence for Risk Assessment (TERA). The database provides in-progress and recently completed chemical risk assessments, and is open for anyone to upload relevant information.  By allowing for user input of projects, RiskIE is perhaps the first chemical risk database open for global participation.  As a potential global tracking system, RiskIE might enable scientists to keep abreast of current chemical evaluations, identify opportunities for collaborations, and decide how to efficiently proceed with chemical registration, such as that of the European Union's Registration, Evaluation, Authorisation and Restriction of Chemicals (REACH).  According to Wullenweber et al. (2008), whereas risk databases have historically managed the risk data of a single country/organization (with some exceptions, e.g., Risk Assessment Information System (RAIS), International Toxicity Estimates for Risk (ITER), Toxipedia), RiskIE offers a centralized database open to all.

Michael Dourson and Toxicology Excellence for Risk Assessment (TERA)
Prior to starting the nonprofit corporation TERA in 1995, Dourson worked for fifteen years as a toxicologist with the United States Environmental Protection Agency. After 21 years as an independent organization, TERA then merged with the University of Cincinnati, College of Medicine, where it continued its mission to protect public health. However, after two years the University and TERA decided to separate with independent, but related, missions.  Michael now serves as TERA's Director of Science.

The International Toxicity Estimates for Risk (ITER) Database

According to Wullenweber in 2008, TERA provides an online database International Toxicity Estimates for Risk (ITER) database, which "provides chronic human health risk assessment data from a variety of organizations worldwide in a side-by-side format, explains differences in risk values derived by different organizations, and links directly to each organization's website for more detailed information. It is also the only database that includes risk information from independent parties whose risk values have undergone independent peer review."

ITER and RiskIE are also resources that support the mission of the Alliance for Risk Assessment (ARA) by tracking up-to-date information on risk assessment activities and risk assessment values."

Alliance for Risk Assessment (ARA)
The Alliance for Risk Assessment (ARA)—is a collaboration of many different organizations working on one or more projects of mutual interest.  Projects are open to all interested parties.  ARA is led by a steering group of scientists from government, university and environmental science NGO.  ARA fosters collaborations among stakeholders to leverage limited resources.  Databases such as ITER and RiskIE bridge the communication gap between government, industry, academic, and environmental stakeholders. For example, ARA hosts panel discussions with scientists from government, industries, nonprofits and universities on specific chemicals or risk assessment issues.

Funding

According to a joint investigation by InsideClimate News and the Center for Public Integrity TERA's risk-assessment database "receives financial and in-kind support from many companies and government agencies." A review of TERA's website shows that funding is approximately 2/3s government and other nonprofit and approximately 1/3 industry and industry related.  TERA has conducted over 100 peer-review meetings with approximately 50 percent of the peer-review panels for studies funded by industry groups; risk values that were accepted in, or changed because of, peer review are included in ITER.  Risk assessment methods or issues that were peer reviewed are described in separate reports.  Highlights of these reviews include risk assessment documents associated with the World Trade Center 2001 disaster and the West Virginia MCHM spill of 2014.  TERA has close ties to it sponsors which include government, industries, nonprofits and universities.  TERA encourages collaborative work whenever possible.

References 

Occupational safety and health